Shax may refer to:

Shax (board game), an African board game
Shax (Charmed), a demon antagonist from the TV series Charmed
Shax, a demon in the Ars Goetia
Shax, a Dungeons & Dragons vestige, a quasi-deity based on the Goetic demon
Shax, a nickname for William Shakespeare